WWE is a sports entertainment company based in Stamford, Connecticut. Former employees (family name letters I–M) in WWE consist of professional wrestlers, managers, play-by-play and color commentators, announcers, interviewers, referees, trainers, script writers, executives, and board of directors.

WWE talents' contracts range from developmental contracts to multi-year deals. They primarily appeared on WWE television programming, pay-per-views, and live events, and talent with developmental contracts appeared at NXT (formerly Florida Championship Wrestling), or they appeared at WWE's former training facilities: Deep South Wrestling, Heartland Wrestling Association, International Wrestling Association, Memphis Championship Wrestling, or Ohio Valley Wrestling. When talent is released of their contract, it could be for a budget cut, the individual asking for their release, for personal reasons, time off from an injury, or retirement. In some cases, talent has died while they were contracted, such as Brian Pillman, Owen Hart, Eddie Guerrero, and Chris Benoit.

Those who made appearances without a contract and those who were previously released but are currently employed by WWE are not included.

Alumni (I—M)

See also
List of WWE personnel

References

External links
WWE alumni at WWE.com
WWE alumni by decade at onlineworldofwrestling.com

Lists of professional wrestling personnel
Former personnel I